Jordan Ayimbila (born 14 February 2001) is a Ghanaian professional footballer who plays for Las Vegas Lights in the USL Championship.

Club career

Accra Lions
Born in Accra, Ayimbila started his youth career with the Accra Lions academy. Although initially, he played as a forward, then he later switched to centre back position.

Selangor

On 20 January 2021, Ayimbila moved on loan to Malaysia Super League club side, Selangor. He represent for Selangor II at Malaysia second division football for the 2021 season. He made his debut with senior on 13 March 2021, playing full 90-minutes in a 1–1 home draw against Kuala Lumpur City.

Career statistics

Club

References

External links
 

2001 births
Living people
Association football defenders
Ghanaian footballers
Ghana youth international footballers
Malaysia Super League players
Selangor FA players
Ghanaian expatriate sportspeople in Malaysia
Expatriate footballers in Malaysia
San Antonio FC players
USL Championship players
Las Vegas Lights FC players